The 2012 Women's Junior World Handball Championship was the 18th edition of the tournament and took place in the Czech Republic from 1 to 14 July.

Sweden won the title for the first time after defeating France 29–22 in the final.

Seeding
The pots were announced on April 11, 2012.

Preliminary round
The draw was held on April 18, 2012 in Ostrava, Czech Republic.

All times are local (UTC+2).

Group A

Group B

Group C

Group D

Knockout stage

Championship

Eighthfinals

Quarterfinals

Semifinals

Bronze medal game

Final

5–8th place playoffs

Semifinals

Seventh place game

Fifth place game

9th–16th place playoffs

Quarterfinals

Semifinals

Eleventh place game

Ninth place game

13th–16th place playoffs

Semifinals

15th place game

13th place game

17–20th place playoffs

Semifinals

19th place game

17th place game

21–24th place playoffs

Semifinals

23rd place game

21st place game

Ranking and statistics

Final ranking

Awards
MVP

Topscorer
 (67 goals)

All-star team
Goalkeeper: 
Left wing: 
Left back: 
Pivot: 
Centre back: 
Right back: 
Right wing: 
Chosen by team officials and IHF experts: IHF.info

Statistics

Topscorers

Source: [
http://www.ihf.info/files/competitiondata/726b3ef8-d159-4124-b10e-e2ad52e12cfa/pdf/TOPSCORER.pdf ihf.info]

Top goalkeepers

Source: ihf.info

References

External links
 at IHF.info

2012 Women's Junior World Handball Championship
Women's Junior World Handball Championship
Women's Junior World Handball Championship
2012
Women's handball in the Czech Republic
July 2012 sports events in Europe
Sport in Ostrava